In theoretical physics, one often analyzes theories with supersymmetry in which F-terms play an important role. In four dimensions, the minimal N=1 supersymmetry may be written using a superspace. This superspace involves four extra fermionic coordinates , transforming as a two-component spinor and its conjugate.

Every superfield—i.e. a field that depends on all coordinates of the superspace—may be expanded with respect to the new fermionic coordinates. There exists a special kind of superfields, the so-called chiral superfields, that only depend on the variables  but not their conjugates. The last term in the corresponding expansion, namely , is called the F-term.  Applying an infinitesimal supersymmetry transformation to a chiral superfield results in yet another chiral superfield whose F-term, in particular, changes by a total derivative.  This is significant because then  is invariant under SUSY transformations as long as boundary terms vanish.  Thus F-terms may be used in constructing supersymmetric actions.

Manifestly-supersymmetric Lagrangians may also be written as integrals over the whole superspace. Some special terms, such as the superpotential, may be written as integrals over s only. They are also referred to as F-terms, much like the terms in the ordinary potential that arise from these terms of the supersymmetric Lagrangian.

See also
 D-term
 Supersymmetric gauge theory

Supersymmetric quantum field theory